Dennis John Heath (28 September 1934 – 28 September 2006) was an English professional footballer and manager who made over 120 appearances as an outside right in The Football League for Brentford.

Playing career

Brentford 
An outside right, Heath began his career at Acton, Brentford & Chiswick Schools' League club Alexandra Villa. He was spotted by Brentford youth team manager Alf Bew at age 15. Heath came through the youth ranks at Brentford and was a part of the youth team which reached the semi-finals of the 1952–53 FA Youth Cup. After completing his National Service, Heath made his debut at the age of 19 in a 6–4 Third Division South defeat to Southampton at The Dell on 21 August 1954. Heath quickly established himself in the first team and made 39 appearances during the 1954–55 season.

Heath's appearance-rate dropped off over the course of his career with the Bees (mainly due to a pierced lung suffered in a reserve match against Charlton Athletic during the 1956–57 season), though he made 29 appearances during the 1958–59 season. Heath's final appearance for the club came in a 4–2 defeat to Newport County at Griffin Park on 29 October 1960 and he was released at the end of the 1960–61 season. He made 133 appearances and scored 20 goals during his seven-year spell with the Bees.

Non-League football 
After his release from Brentford, Heath dropped into non-League football and played for Bedford Town, Trowbridge Town, Dover, Chertsey Town and veterans' team Eversheds. He played for Eversheds until the age of 60.

Management career 
While with Chertsey Town, Heath acted as the club's player-manager.

Personal life 
Heath undertook his National Service at Catterick Garrison and served as a PT instructor. Along with a number of other Brentford players, Heath appeared briefly in the 1953 film The Great Game. Heath later entered the building trade and worked with his sons. He died in 2006, on his 72nd birthday. At the time of his death, he was living in Isleworth.

Career statistics

References

1934 births
Footballers from Chiswick
English footballers
Brentford F.C. players
English Football League players
2006 deaths
Bedford Town F.C. players
Trowbridge Town F.C. players
Southern Football League players
Association football outside forwards
Dover F.C. players
Chertsey Town F.C. players
Chertsey Town F.C. managers
English football managers